Olga Erastovna Ozarovskaya (1874 – 1933) was a Russian folklorist, storyteller, performer, writer, and an archivist of fairy tales. She published a few Northern Russian folklore collection books. Additionally she was the first female civil servant, and the first women to do major scientific institution work within the Russian Empire. She worked with Russian folklore performer Mariya Krivopolenova.

Early life and education 
Olga Erastovna von Ozarovskaya was born in St. Petersburg, Russian Empire to parents Erast and Varvara Petrovna von Ozarovsky. Her father was in the Russian artillery. Her brother Alexander was a military officer, and her brother Yuri became an actor and the director of the Alexandrinsky Theatre. 

She graduated with a degree in chemistry from St. Petersburg University (now Saint Petersburg State University); followed by graduating in 1897 with a degree in mathematics from Higher Women's Courses in St. Petersburg.

Career and late life 
At this time in history, women did not hold civil service jobs in the Russian Empire; for her to be hired, the then-finance minister Sergei Witte needed to have a decree signed by Nicholas II of Russia. In 1901 she married Vasily Dmitrievich Sapozhnikov, someone she had met at the Bureau of Weights and Measures; and together they had one son, Vasilko Vasilyevich Ozarovsky. Her husband died in 1910.

In the early 20th-century around 1907, Ozarovskaya began performing in amateur circles and for societies. In 1911, she moved to Moscow and founded the Living Word Studio. Between 1915 to 1925, she travelled to Northern Russia four times in order to document the traditional Northern Russian folktales, songs, and epic stories. In 1915, Ozarovskaya had travelled to Arkhangelsk Governorate to collect songs, there she met Mariya Krivopolenova whom she took along with her to Moscow in order for her to perform. She also transcribed Krivopolenova's work, which helped her work gain popularity.

Ozarovskaya died on 12 June 1933 in Frunze (now Bishkek), Kirghiz ASSR, Soviet Union. Her personal archive is stored in St. Petersburg, in the Pushkin State Museum of Fine Arts.

Publications

See also 

 Bylinas

References 

1874 births
1933 deaths

Storytellers from the Russian Empire
Women storytellers
Writers from Saint Petersburg
Writers from the Russian Empire
Folklorists from the Russian Empire